William Paul Troost-Ekong (born 1 September 1993) is a professional footballer who plays as a centre-back for Serie A club Salernitana, on loan from Watford. He captains the Nigeria national team.

Born in the Netherlands into a mixed Dutch and Nigerian family, he was eligible for both the Netherlands and Nigeria in international football. He made his debut for Nigeria in 2015 and has since earned more than 60 caps.

Club career
Troost-Ekong attended secondary school at Hockerill Anglo-European College in Bishop’s Stortford, in England. He played football at youth level in England for Fulham and Tottenham Hotspur, Troost-Ekong began his senior career in the Netherlands with FC Groningen and FC Dordrecht.

After being linked abroad with transfers to Celtic among others, he signed for Belgian club KAA Gent in July 2015 and was immediately loaned out to Norwegian club FK Haugesund.

In July 2017, Troost-Ekong signed for Turkish Süper Lig club Bursaspor.

On 17 August 2018, Troost-Ekong joined Italian Serie A club Udinese. In his debut season in the Serie A, he made 35 league appearances and was booked four times, helping Udinese to 12th position. The next season, Udinese finished 13th, albeit with two more points. Despite the team's relatively lacklustre league campaigns, Troost-Ekong started (and played for the full 90 minutes) in memorable victories against AC Milan and Juventus in his two seasons at Le Zebrette.

On 29 September 2020, Troost-Ekong signed for EFL Championship side Watford on a five-year contract deal. He scored his first goal for the club in a 3–2 win over Coventry City on 7 November 2020.

On 24 January 2023, Troost-Ekong signed for Serie A club Salernitana on a loan with the option to buy at the end of the season.

International career

Troost-Ekong was born in the Netherlands to a Dutch mother, Eleanore Troost and a Nigerian father. He has two siblings, Emily and Everest.

Despite representing the Netherlands at under-19 and under-20 youth levels, Troost-Ekong eventually chose to represent Nigeria. He made his senior international debut for the Super Eagles on 13 June 2015, playing 90 minutes in an AFCON qualifying match against Chad.

He made three starts for the senior team in 2016 before being selected for Nigeria's under-23 team in their 35-man provisional squad for the Rio 2016 Summer Olympics. In June 2018 he was named in Nigeria's 23-man squad for the 2018 FIFA World Cup in Russia.

Troost-Ekong was named in the country's 23-man squad for the 2019 Africa Cup of Nations, where he scored an 89th-minute winner against South Africa to send his team through to the semi-finals on the way to a third-place finish.

He captained the Super Eagles in the delayed 2021 Africa Cup of Nations, and was named in the tournament Technical Study Group's Best XI of the Group Stage, scoring against Guinea-Bissau. Nigeria went on to be knocked out by Tunisia in the following round.

Career statistics

Club

International

Scores and results list Nigeria's goal tally first, score column indicates score after each Troost-Ekong goal.

Honours
Nigeria U23
 Olympic Bronze Medal: 2016

References

External links

Netherlands profile at OnsOranje

1993 births
Living people
Footballers from Haarlem
Citizens of Nigeria through descent
Nigerian footballers
Dutch footballers
Association football central defenders
Nigeria international footballers
Netherlands youth international footballers
Footballers at the 2016 Summer Olympics
Olympic footballers of Nigeria
Medalists at the 2016 Summer Olympics
Olympic bronze medalists for Nigeria
Olympic medalists in football
2018 FIFA World Cup players
2019 Africa Cup of Nations players
2021 Africa Cup of Nations players
Dutch people of Nigerian descent
Nigerian people of Dutch descent
Fulham F.C. players
Tottenham Hotspur F.C. players
FC Groningen players
FC Dordrecht players
K.A.A. Gent players
FK Haugesund players
Bursaspor footballers
Udinese Calcio players
Watford F.C. players
Eredivisie players
Eerste Divisie players
Eliteserien players
Belgian Pro League players
Süper Lig players
Serie A players
English Football League players
Premier League players
Dutch expatriate footballers
Nigerian expatriate footballers
Dutch expatriate sportspeople in England
Nigerian expatriate sportspeople in England
Expatriate footballers in England
Dutch expatriate sportspeople in Belgium
Nigerian expatriate sportspeople in Belgium
Expatriate footballers in Belgium
Dutch expatriate sportspeople in Norway
Nigerian expatriate sportspeople in Norway
Expatriate footballers in Norway
Nigerian expatriate sportspeople in Turkey
Expatriate footballers in Turkey
Dutch expatriate sportspeople in Italy
Nigerian expatriate sportspeople in Italy
Expatriate footballers in Italy
U.S. Salernitana 1919 players